Jenkinstown could refer to two places in Ireland:

Jenkinstown, County Louth, a town in County Louth
Jenkinstown Park, a parkland in County Kilkenny